In mathematics, in the field of topology, a topological space is said to be a Volterra space if any finite intersection of dense Gδ subsets is dense. Every Baire space is Volterra, but the converse is not true. In fact, any metrizable Volterra space is Baire.

The name refers to a paper of Vito Volterra in which he uses the fact that (in modern notation) the intersection of two dense G-delta sets in the real numbers is again dense.

References
  Cao, Jiling and Gauld, D, "Volterra spaces revisited", J. Aust. Math. Soc. 79 (2005), 61–76. 
  Cao, Jiling and Junnila, Heikki, "When is a Volterra space Baire?", Topology Appl. 154 (2007), 527–532. 
  Gauld, D. and Piotrowski, Z., "On Volterra spaces", Far East J. Math. Sci. 1 (1993), 209–214.
  Gruenhage, G. and Lutzer, D., "Baire and Volterra spaces", Proc. Amer. Math. Soc. 128 (2000), 3115–3124. 
  Volterra, V., "Alcune osservasioni sulle funzioni punteggiate discontinue", Giornale di Matematiche 19 (1881), 76–86.

Properties of topological spaces